The Fajã of Entre Poios, literally meaning the Fajã between Hills/Knolls is a permanent debris field, built from the collapsing cliffs on the northern coast of the civil parish of Velas, in the municipality of Velas, island of São Jorge, in the Portuguese archipelago of the Azores.

There were several families from this district with their own woodlots at Entre Poios, where they would collect wood for their ovens.  This fajã served the purpose of raising wild goats and for the collection of timber, which was transported uphill to the community of Beira (in the centre of the island).

There are three small ravines, one of which is a permanent course, that cross the fajã.

References

See also
 List of fajãs in the Azores

São Jorge Island
Velas
Entre Poios